James T. Minor is a US academic administrator and sociologist. He currently serves as the Chancellor of Southern Illinois University Edwardsville. He took office on March 1, 2022. Minor was appointed Assistant Vice Chancellor and Senior Strategist in the Office of the Chancellor at the California State University in September 2016. He was appointed by the Obama Administration to serve as the Deputy Assistant Secretary in the Office of Postsecondary Education at the U.S. Department of Education from 2014 to 2016.

Academic background 
Minor’s academic background is in Sociology with an emphasis in educational leadership and policy analysis. Minor was born in Detroit, Michigan and graduated from Edwin Denby High School. He began his college career at Jackson State University in Jackson, Mississippi, where he received his B.A. in Sociology, his M.A. in Sociology from University of Nebraska in Lincoln, Nebraska, and earned his Ph.D in Educational Leadership and Policy Analysis with a concentration in Higher Education at University of Wisconsin-Madison. After earning his Ph.D., Minor completed a post-doctoral appointment at the Pullias Center for the Higher Education at the University of Southern California conducting research on academic governance and post-secondary performance.

Career 
Minor served as an assistant professor and a tenured associate professor at Michigan State University from 2004 to 2010.  He suspended his academic post to serve as the Director of Higher Education Programs at the Southern Education Foundation from 2010 to 2014.

In 2014, Minor was appointed by the Obama Administration as the Deputy Assistant Secretary in the Office of Postsecondary Education in the U.S. Department of Education, initially under Secretary Arne Duncan, then under Secretary John King Jr until 2016.

In 2016, Minor became Assistant Vice Chancellor and Senior Strategist of the 23-campus California State University (CSU) system - the largest and most diverse four-year public university system in the United States. Minor was appointed to provide leadership for the system’s signature initiative Graduation Initiative 2025, aimed at dramatically improving degree completion rates for underrepresented students, facilitating faculty innovation and implementing major system-wide policy reform. In 2018, the CSU reported that graduation rates reached all-time high and the lowest rate of equity gaps among minority and underrepresented students

In 2021, Minor was chosen as the 10th Chancellor of Southern Illinois University Edwardsville. As an innovative leader and firm believer in the transformative power of higher education, Minor has a vision to maintain a positive trajectory for the SIUE community, with a strong focus on student success.

Awards and honors 

Partial list of awards and honors

2016 Carl A. Grant Scholar, Wisconsin Center for Educational Research, University of Wisconsin-Madison
2010 University of Wisconsin-Madison School of Education Outstanding Alumni Award
2004 Jackson State University National Alumni Association Educator of the Year 
2003 Association for the Study of Higher Education (ASHE) Committee on Ethnic Participation (CEP) Junior Scholar Award
1999 University of Wisconsin-Madison Marilyn Gaddis School of Education Scholarship Award
1998 American Sociological Association Research Fellowship
1998 University of Nebraska Multicultural Affairs Award for Teaching and Service

References 

American sociologists
American academic administrators
Living people
Year of birth missing (living people)